The 1993–94 NBA season was the Bullets' 33rd season in the National Basketball Association. The Bullets received the sixth pick in the 1993 NBA draft, and selected Calbert Cheaney out of Indiana University, and also selected 7' 7" Romanian center Gheorghe Mureșan with the 30th pick. In the off-season, the team acquired former All-Star center Kevin Duckworth from the Portland Trail Blazers, signed free agents Kenny Walker and undrafted rookie guard Mitchell Butler, and released LaBradford Smith to free agency after seven games, as he later on signed with the Sacramento Kings. 

However, Duckworth never lived up to expectations as he struggled with weight problems, where he weighed up to 340 lbs during the season. After a 6–6 start to the season, the Bullets struggles continued losing ten straight games in December, holding a 15–32 record at the All-Star break, then suffering a nine-game losing streak in March. Injuries continued to bite the team as key players like Cheaney, and Rex Chapman both missed significant stretches, and Pervis Ellison missed half of the season again, only playing just 47 games. The Bullets finished last place in the Atlantic Division with a 24–58 record.

Chapman and second-year forward Don MacLean both led the team in scoring with 18.2 points per game each, while MacLean was named Most Improved Player of the Year, and second-year star Tom Gugliotta averaged 17.1 points and 9.3 rebounds per game. Michael Adams provided the team with 12.1 points, 6.9 assists and 1.4 steals per game, while Cheaney contributed 12.0 points per game, and Ellison provided with 7.3 points and 5.1 rebounds per game. Following the season, Ellison signed as a free agent with the Boston Celtics, while Adams was traded to the Charlotte Hornets, and head coach Wes Unseld resigned after six in a half seasons coaching the Bullets. 27 years later, Unseld's son, Wes Unseld Jr. became the head coach of the renamed Wizards team in 2021, one year after his father's death due to pneumonia at the age of 74 in 2020.

On January 7, 1994, the Bullets nearly dealt with tragedy as forward Larry Stewart was gagged, shot in the neck, and stabbed in the right thigh by four intruders in his Baltimore county home. He was taken to Baltimore's shock trauma center, where the doctors found that the bullet had passed through his neck, narrowly missing his spinal cord. Stewart had only played just three games this season due to a foot injury.

Draft picks

Roster

Regular season

Season standings

z – clinched division title
y – clinched division title
x – clinched playoff spot

Record vs. opponents

Game log

Player statistics

NOTE: Please write the players statistics in alphabetical order by last name.

Awards and records
 Don MacLean, NBA Most Improved Player Award

Transactions

References

See also
 1993–94 NBA season

Washington Wizards seasons
Wash
Wiz
Wiz